Emile Jurgens (30 September 1878 – 8 July 1929) was a Dutch sports shooter. He competed at the 1912 Summer Olympics and the 1920 Summer Olympics. His older brother Franciscus Jurgens also competed for the Netherlands in shooting at the 1920 Summer Olympics.

References

External links
 

1878 births
1929 deaths
Dutch male sport shooters
Olympic shooters of the Netherlands
Shooters at the 1912 Summer Olympics
Shooters at the 1920 Summer Olympics
Sportspeople from Oss